Algeria (ALG) competed at the 1971 Mediterranean Games in İzmir, Turkey.

Medal summary

Medal table

References

International Mediterranean Games Committee

Nations at the 1971 Mediterranean Games
1971
Mediterranean Games